The Hamilton Majors were a junior ice hockey team in the Ontario Hockey Association for one season in  1943-1944. The team was based in Hamilton, Ontario, playing home games at the Barton Street Arena, also known as the Hamilton Forum. The Majors finished third in their group. The following year the team was disbanded. Three alumni from the Whizzers graduated to play in the National Hockey League.

NHL alumni
Jack Jackson, Enio Sclisizzi, Jack Stoddard

Yearly results

External links
 Hamilton Forum - The OHL Arena & Travel Guide

1943 establishments in Ontario
1944 disestablishments in Ontario
Defunct Ontario Hockey League teams
Ice hockey clubs established in 1943
Ice hockey clubs disestablished in 1944
Ice hockey teams in Hamilton, Ontario